FIFA, through several companies, sold the rights for the broadcast of 2010 FIFA World Cup to the following broadcasters.

Television 
Broadcasters that screened some or all of the matches in high definition are in bold. Broadcasters that screened matches in 3D are italicised.

Notes

Radio

Internet

Mobile and Cellular Services/Broadcasting

References

External links 
 ESPN Soccer World Cup coverage online
 IPTV Sports International World Cup coverage

Broadcasting rights
FIFA World Cup broadcasting rights